Motorola Edge 30 is a series of Android smartphones developed by Motorola Mobility, a subsidiary of Lenovo.

References

External links

Mobile phones introduced in 2022
Android (operating system) devices
Motorola smartphones
Mobile phones with multiple rear cameras
Mobile phones with 4K video recording